A Moment Like the Longest Day is the fourth studio album by the Serbian Irish folk/Celtic rock band Orthodox Celts released in 2002.

Produced by Block Out leader Nikola Vranjković and featuring only one cover of a traditional Irish song, "Humors of Scariff", A Moment Like the Longest Day is more rock-oriented than the band's previous releases.

In 2021 the album was polled 91st on the list of 100 Best Serbian Albums Since the Breakup of SFR Yugoslavia. The list was published in the book Kako (ni)je propao rokenrol u Srbiji (How Rock 'n' Roll in Serbia (Didn't) Came to an End).

Track listing

Personnel 
 Aleksandar Petrović– vocals
 Ana Đokić – violin, vocals (on track 6), backing vocals
 Dušan Živanović – drums, percussion
 Dejan Lalić – mandolin, acoustic guitar, electric guitar, bagpipes, tin whistle
 Vladan Jovkovic - acoustic guitars, backing vocals
 Dejan Grujić – bass, acoustic guitar, electric guitar, keyboards, backing vocals
 Dejan Popin – tin whistle, whistle

Additional personnel 
 Nikola Vranjković – guitar (on track 1), producer
 Mladen Vasojević – cymbal (on track 2)
 Aleksandar Balać – backing vocals (on track 3)
 Bojan Bratić – accordion (on track 4)
 Jelena Popin – backing vocals (on tracks: 7, 9, 10)
 Stevan Vitas – keyboards (on tracks: 1, 2, 6, 7, 9, 11)
 Velja Mijanović – engineer, mastering

Legacy
In 2021 the album was polled 91st on the list of 100 Best Serbian Albums Since the Breakup of SFR Yugoslavia. The list was published in the book Kako (ni)je propao rokenrol u Srbiji (How Rock 'n' Roll in Serbia (Didn't) Came to an End).

References

 A Moment Like The Longest Day at Discogs

External links 
 A Moment Like The Longest Day at Discogs

Orthodox Celts albums
2002 albums
Metropolis Records (Serbia) albums